Avión is a municipality in the Spanish province of Ourense. It has a population of 1,910 (2016) and an area of 121 km².

The town is the summer retreat of Spanish-Mexican millionaire Olegario Vázquez Raña who has hosted Mexican billionaire Carlos Slim there several times, and of other wealthy Mexicans who own summer homes there.

Demography 
From: INE Archiv

References  

Municipalities in the Province of Ourense